"Tonight" is a single from Hungarian artist Kállay Saunders, featuring vocals from Swedish rapper Rebstar. It was released as a single 8 August 2012 for digital download in the Hungary. It was written by Ándras Kállay-Saunders, Rebin Shah and produced by DJ Pain 1 and Mark Pacsai.

Music video
A music video to accompany the release of "Tonight" was first released onto YouTube on 8 August 2012 at a total length of four minutes and fourteen seconds.

Chart performance
"Tonight" debuted at number 24 on the Hungarian charts on 4 November 2012. The song peaked the MAHASZ Top 40 Radio Charts at number 5.

Track listings
 Digital download
 "Tonight" - 4:14

Credits and personnel
 Vocals – Kállay Saunders, Rebstar
 Producer – DJ Pain 1, Mark Pacsai
 Lyrics – Kállay Saunders, Rebin Shah
 Label: Today Is Vintage

Charts

Year-end charts

Release history

References

2012 singles
2012 songs